BK Ventspils is a professional basketball club that is located in Ventspils, Latvia. The club competes in the Latvian-Estonian Basketball League.

History
BK Ventspils was founded in 1994. In first years Ventspils proved themselves as relevant part of Latvian basketball, but major step came in 1997 when Ventspils Olympic Center was built. At that time Ventspils started to play in international competitions playing in 1997–98 edition of FIBA Korać Cup, which was followed by playing in FIBA Saporta Cup. Meanwhile, in the Latvian League Ventspils reached finals in both 1998 and 1999, but in 2000 they won their first domestic title and then went on to win seven consecutive from 2000 to 2006. The team won its eight Latvian League championship in 2009.

During that championship run Ventspils also had great performances in European competitions. In the 2002–03 season Ventspils reached FIBA Champions Cup Final Four, where they finished third. In the 2003–04 season Ventspils debuted in the ULEB Cup competition, making  eighthfinals. In the 2004–05 ULEB Cup season, Ventspils reached new heights and missed semifinals after, losing by one point in two game series against Hemofarm. Before the 2009–10 season, Ventspils participated in the EuroLeague Qualifying round, becoming the first Latvian team to do so.

Ventspils has been a team for many players to establish themselves on the European stage, such as Mire Chatman, Marijonas Petravičius, Jānis Blūms, Brent Wright, and others, who later had successful careers at the EuroLeague level.

In 2013, BK Ventspils became the first Latvian club to have won the Baltic Basketball League, after winning the first leg by a score of 69:91, and losing the second, by a score of just 70:73, in the finals against Prienai, from Lithuania. In the following season, BK Ventspils won their first Latvian League title since 2009, becoming the champions of the 2014 Latvian Basketball League campaign.

Honours

League
Latvian-Estonian League
Winners (1): 2019
Latvian League: 
Winners (10): 2000, 2001, 2002, 2003, 2004, 2005, 2006, 2009, 2014, 2018
Runners-up (10): 1998, 1999, 2007, 2011, 2012, 2013, 2015, 2017, 2019, 2021, 2022
Bronze (5): 1996, 2008, 2010, 2016, 2020
Latvian Cup
Runners-up (1): 2022 
Baltic League
Winners (1): 2013
Runners-up (1): 2015
Bronze (2): 2007, 2010
North European Basketball League
Bronze (1): 2002
FIBA Europe Champions Cup
Bronze (1): 2003

Season by season

Roster

Depth chart

Notable players

  Rihards Lomažs
  Artis Ate
  Ainars Bagatskis
  Dairis Bertāns
  Artūrs Bērziņš
  Jānis Blūms
  Sandis Buškevics
  Kaspars Cipruss
  Raimonds Gabrāns
  Raitis Grafs
  Māris Gulbis
  Dāvis Gūtmanis
  Uvis Helmanis
  Kristaps Janičenoks
  Mareks Jurevičus
  Ernests Kalve
  Rihards Kuksiks
  Toms Leimanis
  Mārtiņš Meiers
  Kārlis Muižnieks
  Ivars Timermanis
  Jānis Timma
  Mārtiņš Skirmants
  Artūrs Strēlnieks
  Jānis Strēlnieks
  Andrejs Šeļakovs
  Aigars Šķēle
  Armands Šķēle
  Žanis Peiners
  Kristaps Purnis
  Juris Umbraško
  Raimonds Vaikulis
  Arnis Vecvagars
  Sandis Valters
  Ronalds Zaķis
  Uģis Viļums
  Aigars Vītols
  Aigars Zeidaks
  Akselis Vairogs
  Marijonas Petravičius
  Kęstutis Šeštokas
  Saulius Kuzminskas
  Simas Buterlevičius
  Edgaras Želionis
  Vladimir Štimac
  Bojan Bakić
  Georgios Tsiakos
   Dušan Jelić
  Nikos Gkikas
  Akin Akingbala
  Weyinmi Efejuku
  Mamadi Diané
  Emmanuel Ubilla
  Denis Ikovlev
   Mike Lenzly
  Rashad Anderson
  Jimmy Baxter
  Tyrone Brazelton
  Rasheed Brokenborough
  Mike Bruesewitz
  Dominez Burnett
  Folarin Campbell
  Tweety Carter
  Warren Carter
  Mire Chatman
  Ricky Clemons
  Willie Deane
  John Gilchrist
  Jerai Grant
  Steven Gray
  Blake Hamilton
  Darnell Hoskins
  Brandon Hunter
  Ted Jeffries
  Dalron Johnson
  Michael-Hakim Jordan
  Justin Love
  Bernard King
  Willie Kemp
  Chester Mason
  Dan McClintock
  Chad McClendon
  Gerry McNamara
  Aaron Pettway
  Eddie Shannon
  Casey Shaw
  Lewis Sims
  Kip Stone
  Jamaal Tatum
  Terrance Thomas
  Lorenzo Williams
  Brent Wright
  Jahmar Young

Notable coaches

 Armands Krauliņš
 Kārlis Muižnieks
 Agris Galvanovskis
 Guntis Endzels

 Gundars Vētra
 Gašper Okorn
 Silvano Poropat
 Algirdas Brazys

 Roberts Štelmahers
 Artūrs Visockis-Rubenis

References

External links
Official Website 
Eurocup Team Page
FIBA Europe Team Page
Baltic League Team Page
Latvian League Team Page
Eurobasket.com Team Page

Bk Ventspils
Basketball teams in Latvia